Robert John (born on November 10, 1961 in Birmingham, Alabama) is an American music photographer. He was the primary photographer for the hard rock band Guns N' Roses for almost two decades.

Biography
Born in Birmingham, Alabama on November 10, 1961, John moved to California with his parents when he was three years old. In his youth, he had a racing career that ended after an injury to his back and the death of his father.   

In 1982, John started as a professional photographer in the music industry by shooting W.A.S.P., London, LA Guns and Hollywood Rose. When the latter became Guns N' Roses, John worked with them and became their exclusive photographer when the band was signed to Geffen Records. Currently he is staff photographer at Twisted South Magazine and Evel Knievel Enterprises.

In 2003, John sued Guns N' Roses frontman Axl Rose for breach of contract over photos that John had been taking of the band since 1985. He later established an online video channel dedicated to the band. 

In 2014 , John married his wife Lori Moody, born and raised in Downey, Ca. He has two step sons; Kenny And Christian Perez .

Clients

Music
Alice Cooper
Asia
Eric Clapton
Ozzy Osbourne
Elton John
Backstreet Boys
The Rolling Stones
The Cult
London
Aerosmith
Jane's Addiction
Faith No More
Marilyn Manson
Sepultura
W.A.S.P.
London
LA Guns
Guns N' Roses (originally photographed them as Hollywood Rose)
became the band's exclusive photographer when the band signed to Geffen Records
authored one book entitled Guns N' Roses: The Photographic History
photography appears in a Guns N' Roses pinball machine
appeared in:
Appetite For Destruction: The Days of Guns N' Roses by Danny Sugerman
Hollywood Rocks! on Cleopatra Records.
cameo appearances in some Guns N' Roses music videos
featured on TV in:
VH1's Behind The Music
a BBC documentary called Guns N' Roses: The Photographic History (named after John's book) by Indigo Productions
Bio. Guns N' Roses  - Biography.
Motörhead
albums
Inferno
Kiss of Death
Motörizer
The Wörld Is Yours
Aftershock
photographed the tours that supported those releases

Record labels

Geffen Records
Sony BMG, Universal Records
Warner Bros. Records
Interscope
Atlantic Records
Virgin Records
Island Records
Capitol Records
Columbia Records
RCA Records
Elektra Records
EMI
SPV GmbH
Century Media
Metal Blade

Magazines

Rolling Stone
RIP
Kerrang
Spin Magazine
Alternative Press magazine
Revolver Magazine
HITS Magazine
Guitar World
Hamilton This Month
Guitarist
Hard Rock
Raw Magazine
Music Life
Hard Break
Deep Purple in Rock
Popgear
Suosikk
Grindhouse
Terrorizer
Metal Edge
Metal Hammer
Twisted South

References
Citations

Further reading

External links
Robert John Photography — official website

1961 births
Living people
American photographers
Artists from Birmingham, Alabama